The term Eparchy of Kyiv may refer to:

 Eparchy of Kyiv (Orthodox Church of Ukraine), central (primatial) eparchy of the Orthodox Church of Ukraine
 Eparchy of Kyiv (Moscow Patriarchate), central (primatial) eparchy of the Ukrainian Orthodox Church (Moscow Patriarchate) under the supreme ecclesiastical jurisdiction of the Russian Orthodox Church
 Eparchy of Kyiv (Kyiv Patriarchate), central (primatial) eparchy of the former Ukrainian Orthodox Church (Kyiv Patriarchate)
 Eparchy of Kyiv (Ukrainian Autocephalous Orthodox Church), central eparchy of the former Ukrainian Autocephalous Orthodox Church
 Eparchy of Kyiv (Ukrainian Autocephalous Orthodox Church Canonical), central eparchy of the Ukrainian Autocephalous Orthodox Church Canonical
 Ukrainian Catholic Archeparchy of Kyiv, central eparchy of the Ukrainian Byzantine Catholic Church

See also
 Kyiv